Neidpath may refer to:

Neidpath Castle, Scotland
Neidpath, Saskatchewan, Canada